Akin is an unincorporated community in Eastern Township, Franklin County, Illinois, United States. Akin had a post office, which closed on July 2, 2011.

History
The post office had been in operation at Akin since 1860. George W. Aken, the first postmaster, most likely gave the community his name.

References

Unincorporated communities in Franklin County, Illinois
Unincorporated communities in Illinois